Kampong Lumut or commonly known as Lumut, is a coastal settlement in Belait District, Brunei, about  from the district town Kuala Belait.

History 
Archaeological evidence found in Lumut suggests that human activity had existed in the area as early as the fourteenth century; Chinese and Siamese potteries dateable to the time corresponding to the Ming Dynasty (1368-1644) had been unearthed in the vicinity of the Lumut River. However, the characteristics of the evidence suggests that the site was for burial rather than residential purpose.

Administration 

For subdivision purposes the area is divided into two villages, namely Kampong Lumut I ("one") and Kampong Lumut II ("two"), where each is overseen by a village head. The village head of Kampong Lumut I oversees the following census villages:

Meanwhile, the village head of Kampong Lumut II oversees the following census villages:

Kampong Lumut I and Kampong Lumut II, including the constituent census villages, are among the village subdivisions under Mukim Liang.

Transportation

Land 
The village is connected via Jalan Kampong Lumut and Telisai–Lumut Highway. The three locations for Belait's feeder hub stations have been determined by the Land Transport Department (LTD), allowing residents who live distant from Seria and Kuala Belait to be more linked between the two towns. The three locations are a space close to Kampong Sungai Liang Mosque, a space outside the entrance to the Lumut National Housing Plan (RPN) along the Telisai–Lumut Highway, and a space inside the School of Science and Engineering campus for the other Kampong Lumut residents. In order for passengers to board the intra-district buses traveling to the bus terminals in Seria and Kuala Belait, feeder buses will drop them off at designated locations near the RPN Lumut, Kampong Lumut, and Mukim Liang.

Water 
Gerai Aneka Jetty Lumut is close to the mouth of Lumut River, which gave rise to a variety of activities, and is located immediately off the old Jalan Kampong Lumut road leading to the Tutong and Brunei-Muara districts. Providing a location to support the activities, the area underwent a transformation with a small shelter to house the booths tended by local entrepreneurs and their businesses.

The Brunei LNG terminal at Lumut is made out of a  new side berth and a  jetty that extends from the LNG facility.

Infrastructures 

The Lumut Camp (Perkhemahan Lumut) is the sole military base in the district and it housed the Royal Brunei Land Forces (RBLF) Third Battalion since 21 June 2007.

Residents of Mukim Labi's inner parts also receive water supplies from the Sungai Liang water treatment facility in Kampong Agis-Agis.

The Lumut Lighthouse sits at the coast of Kampong Sungai Kayu Ara, facing the beach.

In the district, the summit of Lumut Hill (Bukit Lumut) is used as the observation point for the month of Ramadan.

The village also has its own post office.

Housing 
The area encompasses RPN Lumut, a public housing estate. At a presentation ceremony held at the multi-purpose hall of the Liang Lumut Recreational Club, Sultan Hassanal Bolkiah presented over 180 residents of the district with land grants under the Temporary Occupation Licence (TOL) Scheme for Belait District and house keys under the Kampong Lumut/Liang National Housing Scheme during Hari Raya in 2010. The Kampong Lumut/Sungai Liang National Housing Scheme's Phases One and Two saw the construction of 294 homes and the distribution of 164 land lots to qualified residents.

Education 
The local primary schools include Lumut Primary School and Sungai Tali Primary School.

Another  in the area is Sungai Taring Primary School, located in a separate building adjacent to Sungai Tali Primary School.

Lumut is also home to the following educational institutions:
 Pengiran Anak Puteri Hajah Rashidah Sa'adatul Bolkiah Secondary School (SMPAP) — one of the few government secondary schools in Belait District. The school complex sits on a  land; the construction began in November 1992 and completed in about 14 months. It was named after Princess Rashidah, the eldest daughter of Sultan Hassanal Bolkiah with the queen consort Queen Saleha.
 School of Science and Engineering campus of Brunei Polytechnic — one of the few technical colleges in the country. The building complex was originally built and intended to be a second secondary school in the area to alleviate the growing number of students in Pengiran Anak Puteri Hajah Rashidah Sa'adatul Bolkiah Secondary School. The decision to repurpose the school into a technical college was then intended to take advantage of the school's close proximity to the country's oil and gas industry near Seria town.

Religion 
Zainab Mosque is the sole village mosque; it was inaugurated by Sultan Hassanal Bolkiah on 22 May 1998. It can accommodate 2,000 worshippers.

Recreation 
The area is home to Lumut Beach, a public beach recreational area.

It is also home to Liang Lumut Recreation Club (LLRC) which has a multipurpose hall and a small waterpark.

The space of Aneka Gerai Jetty Lumut was changed to include a small shelter to house the booths handled by neighborhood business owners and their enterprises, providing a comfortable and handy venue to support the activities. The Welfare and Community Bureau of the Village Consultative Council (MPK) of Kampong Lumut II came up with the idea for this specific shelter with the intention of offering a focal point for activities and exhibiting the surrounding area.

Economy

Petrolchemical 
The Brunei LNG plant, a  liquified natural gas plant with annual production capacity of 6.7 million tonnes. The intended 20-year supply promise for the project was met by the 130-hectare complex. There has been a complete plant rejuvenation that has cost more than B$500 million over the course of the final five years of this arrangement. All of the plant's principal components, including the five liquefaction trains and their related buildings, were renovated as part of the revitalization. Additionally, two new storage tanks and a new loading jetty were built.

Fisheries 
Fishermen from Liang are concerned about the Lumut River's reduction in water levels since they have to push their boats through crocodile-infested waters on foot. Despite the abundance of fish that has been available to Belait fisherman recently, dry weather has resulted in lower than typical river tides.

Notes

References 

Belait District
Populated places in Brunei